De Lancey's Brigade, also known as De Lancey's Volunteers, De Lancey's Corps, De Lancey's Provincial Corps, De Lancey's Refugees, and the "Cowboys" or "Cow-boys", was a Loyalist British provincial military unit, raised for service during the American War of Independence. Its commanders were  Brigadier General Oliver De Lancey and his nephew James De Lancey.

History
De Lancey's Brigade was raised in September 1776 on Long Island, New York, after the Patriot forces had lost the Battle of Brooklyn during the British New York Campaign.  The Brigade consisted of three battalions of five hundred men each, with De Lancey serving both as brigadier general and colonel of the 1st Battalion.

In the winter of 1776–1777, De Lancey's three battalions were stationed (one each) at Oyster Bay, Huntington, Brookhaven, Long Island, and Kingsbridge, Bronx.  In May 1777, the 1st and 2nd Battalions moved to the Kingsbridge area, north of Manhattan. The following month, the 1st returned to Long Island, while the 2nd remained at Kingsbridge. In the spring of 1778, the forts that had been erected at Huntington and Brookhaven were abandoned, and the 1st and 3rd Battalions removed to encamp near New Town.

Brigadier General Oliver De Lancy conducted regular operations in the region north of New York City, in Westchester County, New York, between Morrisania and the Croton Rivers, which was known as the "Neutral Ground". Lawlessness and guerrilla warfare were carried out by De Lancey's "Cowboys" and their compatriots, the New Jersey Volunteers, known by their nickname, the "Skinners." Both were British loyalist marauders who stole cattle, looted, and gathered military intelligence in the New York countryside.

In November 1778, although the Brigade had originally been formed "for the defense of Long Island", the 1st and 2nd Battalions were ordered South, where they served under Lt. Col. Archibald Campbell.  The 1st and 2nd Battalions fought successfully in the Siege of Ninety-Six and at the Battle of Eutaw Springs and other battles in the Carolinas. The 3rd Battalion remained on Long Island for the entire war, as did De Lancey himself.

The entire brigade was disbanded in Woodstock, New Brunswick in 1783. Many of the regiment settled in Nova Scotia after the war. The 2nd regiment were in a ship wreck off Nova Scotia, killing 99 of 174 men.

References

Further reading 
Gue, Belle Willey and John D. Felter.  The Neutral Ground.  Boston:  Stratford Company, 1922. 
Johnson, James M., Christopher Pryslopski, Andrew Villani  Eds. Key to the Northern Country: The Hudson River Valley in the American Revolution.  Albany, NY:  SUNY Press, 2013.
Kemble, Lieut. Col. Stephen.  Journals of Lieut. Col. Stephen Kemble, 1773-1789: And British Army Orders: Gen. Sir William Howe, 1775-1778; Gen. Sir Henry Clinton, 1778; and Gen. Daniel Jones, 1778, American Revolutionary series: British accounts of the American Revolution, British accounts of the American Revolution, Volume 16 of Collections of the New-York Historical Society for the year ...  New York:  Ardent Media, 1972.
Ward, Harry M.  Between the Lines: Banditti of the American Revolution.  Santa Barbara, CA:  Praeger, 2002.

External links
 Index to DeLancey's Brigade History - The On-Line Institute for Advanced Loyalist Studies
 DeLancey's Brigade, Second Battalion, Captain Allison's Company, recreated unit

Loyalist military units in the American Revolution
Kingsbridge, Bronx
History of the Bronx